Kõrvemaa Landscape Conservation Area is a nature park situated in Lääne-Viru County, Estonia.

Its area is 20653 ha.

The protected area was designated in 1959 to protect landscapes and biodiversity of Aegviidu and its surrounding areas.

References

Nature reserves in Estonia
Geography of Lääne-Viru County